Beterya (Beterä) is a rural locality (a village) in Temyasovsky Selsoviet, Baymaksky District, Bashkortostan, Russia. The population was 323 as of 2010. There are 8 streets.

Geography 
Beterya is located 71 km north of Baymak (the district's administrative centre) by road. Saksay is the nearest rural locality.

References 

Rural localities in Baymaksky District